Divoš may refer to:

 Divoš, Serbia, a village in Serbia near Sremska Mitrovica
 Divoš, Croatia, a village in Croatia near Ernestinovo